is the railway station in Ōmura, Nagasaki Prefecture, Japan. It is operated by JR Kyushu and is on the Ōmura Line.

Lines
Besides the local services on the line, some trains of the Rapid Seaside Liner also stop at the station.

Station layout 
The station consists of two side platforms serving two tracks. A siding branches off the main tracks and runs in between the station building and the platforms. The station building, a modern steel-frame structure, is unstaffed and serves as a waiting room with an automated ticket vending machine. Access to the platforms is by means of a level crossing.

Adjacent stations

History
By 1897, the track had reached . In the next phase of expansion, the track was extended towards  which opened as the new terminus on 20 January 1898. Matsubara was opened on the same day as an intermediate station between Haiki and Ōmura. When the Kyushu Railway was nationalized on 1 July 1907, Japanese Government Railways (JGR) took over control of the station. On 12 October 1909, track from Tosu through Haiki to Nagasaki was designated the Nagasaki Main Line. With the privatization of Japanese National Railways (JNR), the successor of JGR, on 1 April 1987, control of the station passed to JR Kyushu.

Passenger statistics
In fiscal 2014, there were a total of 27,802 boarding passengers, giving a daily average of 76 passengers.

See also
 List of railway stations in Japan

References

External links
Matsubara Station (JR Kyushu)

Railway stations in Nagasaki Prefecture
Railway stations in Japan opened in 1898
Ōmura Line